The 2018 Georgia State Panthers softball team represented Georgia State University in the 2018 NCAA Division I softball season. The Panthers competed in the Sun Belt Conference and were led by eight-year head coach Roger Kincaid.  Georgia State played its home games at the Robert E. Heck Softball Complex in Panthersville, Georgia.

Roster

Schedule

! style="background:#0000FF;color:white;"| Regular season
|- valign="top" 

|- align="center" bgcolor="#ffccc"
| 1 || February 9 || #18 Michigan || Tampa, FL || L 0-8 || 0-1 || -
|- align="center" bgcolor="#ffccc"
| 2 || February 9 || South Florida || Tampa, FL || L 4-5 || 0-2 || -
|- align="center" bgcolor="#ffccc"
| 3 || February 10 || #2 Florida || Tampa, FL || L 0-11 || 0-3 || -
|- align="center" bgcolor="#ffccc"
| 4 || February 10 || Illinois State || Tampa, FL || L 6-7 || 0-4 || -
|- align="center" bgcolor="#ccffcc"
| 5 || February 11 || UAB || Tampa, FL || W 15-4 || 1-4 || -
|- align="center" bgcolor="#ccffcc"
| 6 || February 14 || Georgia Tech || Bob Heck Field || W 5-2 || 2-4 || -
|- align="center" bgcolor="#ccffcc"
| 7 || February 16 || Delaware || Auburn, AL || W 2-1 || 3-4 || -
|- align="center" bgcolor="#ccffcc"
| 8 || February 16 || Saint Francis || Auburn, AL || W 10-3|| 4-4 || -
|- align="center" bgcolor="#ccffcc"
| 9 || February 17 || Delaware || Auburn, AL || W 14-2 || 5-4 || -
|- align="center" bgcolor="#ffccc"
| 10 || February 17 || Saint Francis || Auburn, AL || L 6-7 || 5-5 || -
|- align="center" bgcolor="#ffccc"
| 11 || February 18 || #13 Auburn || Auburn, AL || L 0-5 || 5-6 || -
|- align="center" bgcolor="#ccffcc"
| 12 || February 23 || Northern Iowa || Tuscaloosa, AL || W 3-1 || 6-6 || -
|- align="center" bgcolor="#ffccc"
| 13 || February 23 || #10 Alabama || Tuscaloosa, AL || L 1-5 || 6-7 || -
|- align="center" bgcolor="#ccffcc"
| 14 || February 24 || Northern Iowa || Tuscaloosa, AL || 9-1 || 7-7 || -
|- align="center" bgcolor="#ffccc"
| 15 || February 24 || #9 Florida State || Tuscaloosa, AL || 0-8 || 7-8 || -
|- align="center" bgcolor="#ffffff"
| 16 || February 25 || #10 Alabama || Tuscaloosa, AL || Cancelled || - || -
|-

|- align="center" bgcolor="#ccffcc"
| 17 || March 2 || UConn || Bob Heck Field || W 2-0 || 8-8 || -
|- align="center" bgcolor="#ccffcc"
| 18 || March 2 || UConn || Bob Heck Field || W 9-7 || 9-8 || -
|- align="center" bgcolor="#ccffcc"
| 19 || March 3 || Detroit || Bob Heck Field || W 14-6 || 10-8 || -
|- align="center" bgcolor="#ccffcc"
| 20 || March 3 || Detroit || Bob Heck Field || W 11-1 || 11-8 || -
|- align="center" bgcolor="#ccffcc"
| 21 || March 4 || DePaul || Bob Heck Field || 6-3 || 12-8 || -
|- align="center" bgcolor="#ccffcc"
| 22 || March 7 || Presbyterian || Bob Heck Field || W 3-0 || 13-8 || -
|- align="center" bgcolor="#ffccc"
| 23 || March 10 || Texas State || Bob Heck Field || L 2-0 || 13-9 || 0-1
|- align="center" bgcolor="#ffccc"
| 24 || March 10 || Texas State || Bob Heck Field || L 5-4 || 13-10 || 0-2
|- align="center" bgcolor="#ffffff"
| 25 || March 11 || Texas State || Bob Heck Field || Cancelled || - || -
|- align="center" bgcolor="#ffccc"
| 26 || March 14 || Kennesaw State || Kennesaw, GA || L 0-8 || 13-11 || 0-2
|- align="center" bgcolor="#ccffcc"
| 27 || March 17 || UT-Arlington || Arlington, TX || W 7-1 || 14-11 || 1-2
|- align="center" bgcolor="#ffccc"
| 28 || March 17 || UT-Arlington || Arlington, TX || L 1-3 || 14-12 || 1-3
|- align="center" bgcolor="#ffccc"
| 29 || March 18 || UT-Arlington || Arlington, TX || L 0-4 || 14-13 || 1-4
|- align="center" bgcolor="#ffccc"
| 30 || March 24 || South Alabama || Mobile, AL || W 6-5 || 15-13 || 2-4
|- align="center" bgcolor="#ffccc"
| 31 || March 24 || South Alabama || Mobile, AL || L 3-10 || 15-14 || 2-5
|- align="center" bgcolor="#ffccc"
| 32 || March 25 || South Alabama || Mobile, AL || L 0-5 || 15-15 || 2-6
|- align="center" bgcolor="#ccffcc"
| 33 || March 28 || Georgia Tech || Atlanta, GA || W 3-2 || 16-15 || 2-6
|- align="center" bgcolor="#ffccc"
| 34 || March 30 || Troy || Bob Heck Field || L 1-4 || 16-16 || 2-7
|- align="center" bgcolor="#ccffcc"
| 35 || March 31 || Troy || Bob Heck Field || W 3-2 || 17-16 || 3-7
|- align="center" bgcolor="#ccffcc"
| 36 || March 31 || Troy || Bob Heck Field || W 6-3 || 18-16 || 4-7
|-

|- align="center" bgcolor="#ccffcc"
| 37 || April 4 || Mercer || Bob Heck Field || W 14-8 || 19-16 || 4-7
|- align="center" bgcolor="#ffccc"
| 38 || April 7 || #18 Louisiana || Bob Heck Field || L 4-8 || 19-17 || 4-8
|- align="center" bgcolor="#ffccc"
| 39 || April 7 || #18 Louisiana || Bob Heck Field || L 1-12 || 19-18 || 4-9
|- align="center" bgcolor="#ccffcc"
| 40 || April 8 || #18 Louisiana || Bob Heck Field || W 7-6 || 20-18 || 5-9
|- align="center" bgcolor="#ffccc"
| 41 || April 11 || #5 Georgia || Athens, GA || L 0-7 || 20-19 || 5-9
|- align="center" bgcolor="#ccffcc"
| 42 || April 14 || Appalachian State || Boone, NC || W 4-0 || 21-19 || 6-9
|- align="center" bgcolor="#ccffcc"
| 43 || April 14 || Appalachian State || Boone, NC || W 17-5 || 22-19 || 7-9
|- align="center" bgcolor="#ccffcc"
| 44 || April 15 || Appalachian State || Boone, NC || W 9-2 || 23-19 || 8-9
|- align="center" bgcolor="#ffccc"
| 45 || April 18 || Kennesaw State || Bob Heck Field || L 3-6 || 23-20 || 8-9
|- align="center" bgcolor="#ccffcc"
| 46 || April 21 || Coastal Carolina || Bob Heck Field || W 4-2 || 24-20 || 9-9
|- align="center" bgcolor="#ccffcc"
| 47 || April 21 || Coastal Carolina || Bob Heck Field || W 6-3 || 25-20 || 10-9
|- align="center" bgcolor="#ffffff"
| 48 || April 22 || Coastal Carolina || Bob Heck Field || Cancelled || - || -
|- align="center" bgcolor="#ccffcc"
| 49 || April 28 || ULM || Monroe, LA || W 5-4 || 26-20 || 11-9
|- align="center" bgcolor="#ccffcc"
| 50 || April 28 || ULM || Monroe, LA || W 6-3 || 27-20 || 12-9
|- align="center" bgcolor="#ffccc"
| 51 || April 29 || ULM || Monroe, LA || L 5-8 || 27-21 || 12-10
|-

|- align="center" bgcolor="#ccffcc"
| 52 || May 2 || Chattanooga || Bob Heck Field || W 5-4 || 28-21 || 13-10
|- align="center" bgcolor="#ccffcc"
| 53 || May 4 || Georgia Southern || Bob Heck Field || W 3-2 || 29-21 || 14-10
|- align="center" bgcolor="#ffccc"
| 54 || May 5 || Georgia Southern || Bob Heck Field || L 5-7 || 29-22 || 14-11
|- align="center" bgcolor="#ccffcc"
| 55 || May 5 ||  Georgia Southern || Bob Heck Field || W 8-0 || 30-22 || 15-11
|-

|- align="center" bgcolor="#ccffcc"
| 56 || May 9 || South Alabama || Lafayette, LA || W 8-3 || 31-22 || (1-0)
|- align="center" bgcolor="#ffccc"
| 57 || May 10 || #21 Louisiana || Lafayette, LA || L 1-2 || 31-23 || (1-1)
|- align="center" bgcolor="#ffccc"
| 56 || May 10 || South Alabama || Lafayette, LA || L 2-0 || 31-24 || (1-2)
|-

|

References

Georgia State
Georgia State Panthers softball seasons